Simon Says was an American rock band from Sacramento, California. In 2001, they changed their name to Key to Arson, and they broke up in 2004.

History
Simon Says was formed by a group of California high schoolers (Matt Franks, Zac Diebels, and Mike Johnston) who got their start playing high school auditoriums around the state in the early 1990s. Adding bassist Mike Arrieta in 1995, the group self-released two records, which attracted the attention of manager Jeff Saltzman. Saltzman set them up with Cake's producer Mark Needham and got them signed to Hollywood Records in July 1998. In 1999, they released their major-label debut, Jump Start, which yielded two hit modern rock singles, and the follow-up Shut Your Breath netted a third radio hit.

In 2001, Simon Says left Hollywood Records over promotional issues and changed their name to Key to Arson; soon after, drummer Mike Johnston left the band, to be replaced by Dave "Stixx" Marich. In 2004, Key to Arson announced the completion of an album entitled Light 'Em Up, but by the end of the year the band had broken up.  It is now known that Zac Diebels and Matt Franks have formed Automatic Static and will release a full album soon as of 2012, called Number IV.

Members
 Final line-up
Matt Franks - vocals (1992–2004)
Zac Diebels - guitar (1992–2004)
Mike Arrieta - bass (1995–2004)
Dave "Stixx" Marich - drums (2001–2004)

Former members
Mike Johnston - drums (1992–2001)
Shane Ozmun - bass (1994-1995)

Discography
Touch Yer Toes (self-released, 1994) [demo EP]
Little Boy (self-released, 1997) [independent album]
Perfect Example (self-released, 1997) [independent album]
Jump Start (Hollywood Records, 1999) [debut major label studio album]
Shut Your Breath (Hollywood, 2001) [second major label studio album]
Light Em Up [as Key To Arson] (self released, 2004)

Singles
"Life Jacket" (1999) US Billboard Mainstream Rock Tracks No. 23
"Slider" (1999) Mainstream Rock No. 34
"Sever" (1999)
"Blister (Nothing)" (2001) Mainstream Rock No. 31

References

American post-grunge musical groups
Musical groups from Sacramento, California